Raymond Ronald Jones (born 25 April 1939), better-known as Wizz Jones, is an English acoustic guitarist, singer and songwriter.  He was born in Thornton Heath, Surrey, England and has been performing since the late 1950s and recording from 1965 to the present. He has worked with many of the notable guitarists of the British folk revival, such as John Renbourn and Bert Jansch.

Early days
Jones became infatuated with the bohemian image of Woody Guthrie and Jack Kerouac and grew his hair long. His mother had started calling him Wizzy after the Beano comic strip character "Wizzy the Wuz" because at the age of nine Raymond was a budding magician. The nickname stuck throughout his school years and when he formed his first band, "The Wranglers", in 1957 the name became permanent. Bert Jansch later said, "I think he's the most underrated guitarist ever." In the early 1960s he went busking in Paris, France, and there mixed in an artistic circle that included Rod Stewart, Alex Campbell, Clive Palmer (Incredible String Band) and Ralph McTell. After a couple of years travelling throughout Europe and North Africa he returned to England, and married his long-time girlfriend Sandy to raise a family.

In 1965, his only single was released: Bob Dylan's "Ballad of Hollis Brown". By this time the skiffle boom was over but one of the stars of that movement, Chas McDevitt, used Jones' guitar-playing on five albums in 1965 and 1966. Another musician on those sessions was the bluegrass banjo-player, Pete Stanley. In 1966, Jones and Stanley released an album, Sixteen Tons of Bluegrass, but this partnership broke down in 1967, as Jones then turned solo.

The folk period

Jones started to become a singer-songwriter. His first solo album was Wizz Jones in 1969. Eight of the songs were written by his long-time friend Alan Tunbridge. Up to 1988, ten solo albums followed and he played on Ralph McTell's single "Easy" in 1974. Steve Tilston was also guided by Jones, through the early stages of his career. Jones was once described as having 'a right hand worthy of Broonzy', referring to the blues guitarist Big Bill Broonzy. Most of his recordings from this period are long out of print.

He briefly joined acoustic folk-rock group Accolade (other band members Don Partridge, Brian Cresswell and Malcolm Poole) in 1971 as backing guitarist, and is featured on the group's second album,  Accolade II. Another brief excursion, as a member of the traditional folk band Lazy Farmer in 1975, produced an album that was reissued in 2006. Jones has always maintained a high level of popularity in Germany, since the mid–1970s, and he stills tours mainland Europe every year. The early 1990s were a quiet period, when he almost disappeared from public view.

When in the mid-1990s he appeared on the Bert Jansch television documentary, Acoustic Routes, there was renewed interest in his work. In 2001, he led John Renbourn and other members of Pentangle on the album Lucky The Man. In 2007, The Legendary Me and When I Leave Berlin were reissued on CD by the Sunbeam record label.

On 30 May 2012, Bruce Springsteen opened the sold-out Wrecking Ball concert at Olympic Stadium in Berlin, Germany, with Jones's song, "When I Leave Berlin".

In 2015, Jones toured with John Renbourn, playing a mixture of solo and duo material, before Renbourn died in March that year. An album by the pair, titled Joint Control, was released in 2016.

Discography

Solo albums
Wizz Jones (1969)
The Legendary Me (1970)
Right Now (*) (1972)
Winter Song (E.P.) (1973)
When I Leave Berlin (**) (1973)
Soloflight (***) (1974)
Lazy Farmer (1975)
Happiness Was Free (1976)
Magical Flight (1977)
Letter from West Germany (197?)
The Grapes of Life (1987)
Live In Dublin (cassette tape only, 1991)
Late Nights and Long Days (****) (1993)
Dazzling Stranger (1995)
Through the Fingers (2001)
Lucky The Man (2001)
Young Fashioned Ways (****) (2004)
Huldenberg Blues (Live in Belgium) (2006)
When I Leave Berlin: Expanded Edition (**) (2007)
Lucky the Man (Extra tracks) (2007)
More Late Nights and Long Days (****) (circa 2008)

(*) with John Renbourn, Sue Draheim, and others. (**) with Bert Jansch. (***) includes recordings from 1970 to 1974. (****) with Simeon Jones.

Collaborations and compilations

Pete Stanley and Wizz Jones
Sixteen Tons of Bluegrass (1966) (issued in Italy as Way Out West)
More Than Sixteen Tons of Bluegrass and Other Fine Stuff (2000) (re-issue of above on CD with additional, previously unissued, tracks)

John Renbourn and Wizz Jones
Joint Control (World Music Network, 2017)

Lazy Farmer (including Wizz Jones)
Lazy Farmer (1975)

Wizz Jones and Werner Lämmerhirt
Roll on River (1981)

Anthology – Alex Campbell, Andy Irvine, Wizz Jones, Finbar Furey, Dolores Keane et al.
Folk Friends (1979)
Folk Friends 2 (1981)

Wizz Jones & Ralph McTell
About Time (2016)
About Time Too (2017)

Wizz Jones, Pete Berryman & Simeon Jones 
Come What May (2017)

Compilations
The Village Thing Tapes (1992)

Singles
"The Ballad of Hollis Brown" / "Riff Minor" (1965)

Videos and DVDs
Masters of the British Guitar (VHS) (1998)
Wizz Jones – Maestros of the Guitar No 1 (2006)

Session recordings
Ralph McTell: Easy (1974)
Derroll Adams: Songs of the Banjoman (1984)
Clive Palmer: Clive Palmer's Banjoland'' (recorded 1967, released 2007)

References

External links
 Wizz Jones' website
 Wizz Jones on YouTube
 Extensive discography including session work, Rockinworld
 Informative biographic note, interview and archive photo on Terrascope (author uncredited)

1939 births
Living people
20th-century English male musicians
21st-century English male musicians
English buskers
English folk guitarists
English folk singers
English male guitarists
English male singer-songwriters
People from Thornton Heath